The year 1515 in science and technology included many events, some of which are listed here.

Astronomy
 A year in which Earth's so-called "second moon" Cruithne (discovered in 1986) makes a closest approach to earth. The two are in 1:1 orbital resonance. This next happens about 1903; the following occasion will be in July 2292.

Cartography
 First Johannes Schöner globe produced.

Zoology
 May 15 – An Indian rhinoceros arrives in Lisbon, the first to be seen in Europe since Roman times.

Births
 February 18 – Valerius Cordus, German physician and botanist (died 1544)
 Cristóbal Acosta, Portuguese physician and natural historian (died 1594)
 Giorgio Biandrata, Italian court physician (died 1588)
 Petrus Ramus, French logician (k. 1572)
 Johann Weyer, Dutch physician and occultist (died 1588)
 approx. date – Leonard Digges, English mathematician and surveyor (d. c.1559)

Deaths
 Alonso de Ojeda, Spanish navigator (born c.1466)
 Andreas Stoberl, Austrian astronomer, mathematician and theologian (born 1465)

References

 
16th century in science
1510s in science